Saraswathi Yaamam is a 1980 Indian Malayalam film,  directed by Mohan Kumar. The film stars Jagathy Sreekumar, Prameela, Adoor Bhavani and Janardanan in the lead roles. The film has musical score by A. T. Ummer.

Cast
Jagathy Sreekumar as Sreedhara Pilla
Prameela as Prameela
Adoor Bhavani as Lakshmikutty
Janardanan as Madhu
M. G. Soman as Ramankutty
P. K. Abraham as Muthalali
Bhavani as Salini
Raghavan as Gopi
Poojappura Ravi as Ganesh
Silk Smitha as Padmam
Thrissur Elsy as Madhavi
Suchitra as Bhavani

Soundtrack
The music was composed by A. T. Ummer and the lyrics were written by Vellanad Narayanan.

References

External links
 

1980 films
1980s Malayalam-language films